Ajantrik (known internationally as The Unmechanical, The Mechanical Man or The Pathetic Fallacy) is a 1958 Indian Bengali film written and directed by revered parallel filmmaker Ritwik Ghatak. The film is adapted from a Bengali short story of the same name written by Subodh Ghosh.

A comedy-drama film, Ajantrik is one of the earliest Indian films to portray an inanimate object, in this case an automobile, as a character in the story. It achieves this through the use of sounds recorded post-production to emphasize the car's bodily functions and movements.

The film was considered for a special entry in the Venice Film Festival in 1959.

Plot
Bimal is a taxi-driver in a small provincial town. He lives alone. His taxi (an old 1920 Chevrolet jalopy which he named Jagaddal) is his only companion and, although very battered, it is the apple of Bimal's eye. The film shows episodes from his life in the industrial wasteland, delivering people from one place to another.

Film critic Georges Sadoul shared his experience of watching the film in this way. He said, "What does 'Ajantrik' mean? I don't know and I believe no one in Venice Film Festival knew...I can't tell the whole story of the film...there was no subtitle for the film. But I saw the film spellbound till the very end". According to the noted Bengali poet and German scholar Alokeranjan Dasgupta, "The merciless conflict of ethereal nature and mechanised civilization, through the love of taxi driver Bimal and his pathetic vehicle Jagaddal seems to be a unique gift of...modernism."

Cast 
 Kali Banerjee as Bimal
 Gangapada Basu
 Satindra Bhattacharya
 Tulsi Chakraborty 
 Anil Chatterjee
 Shriman Deepak
 Kajal Gupta as Young woman
 Gyanesh Mukherjee as Mechanic
 Keshto Mukherjee
 Sita Mukherjee as Bulaki

See also 
 List of works of Ritwik Ghatak

References

External links

Bengali-language Indian films
1958 films
Films directed by Ritwik Ghatak
Films based on short fiction
1950s Bengali-language films